Lønningdal is a Norwegian surname. Notable people with the surname include:

Ingrid Lønningdal (born 1981), Norwegian artist
Kristin Kverneland Lønningdal (1923–2010), Norwegian politician

Norwegian-language surnames